Qula was a Palestinian village in the Ramle Subdistrict of Mandatory Palestine. It was located 15 km northeast of Ramla and was depopulated during the 1948 Arab-Israeli War.

Hasan Salama and his son Ali Hassan Salameh (1940-1979) were from Qula.

History

Crusader period
During the twelfth century the Hospitallers established an administrative and collection centre in the village, comprising a tower and a vaulted structure.

Ottoman period
In 1596, Qula was part of the Ottoman Empire, nahiya (subdistrict) of al-Ramla under the Liwa of Gaza, with a population 69 Muslim households; an estimated population of 380. The villagers  paid taxes  on goats and beehives, and a press that was used for processing either olives or grapes, in addition of a fixed sum: a total of 6,650 akçe.

In 1838  Kuleh  was among the villages  Edward Robinson noted from the top of the White Mosque, Ramla.

In 1870, the French explorer Victor Guérin noted: "This village, located on a rocky hill, obviously replaced a small town or ancient village. There is a large building now divided into several private dwellings, built either by the Muslims or by the Christians at the time of the  Crusades, with cut stones removed  from old buildings.

Besides, there is another construction, less extensive than the preceding one, but the lower courses of which are formed with much larger blocks, either flattened or cut into bosses, still serving at present as a tower, or defense tower.

All the upper part is of a much more recent date. A small mosque is similarly built with materials of which at least half seem ancient. At the door in particular of this sanctuary the feet are decorated with moldings that seem to be pointing to a time before the Muslim invasion. Finally, near the village, a birket, (a pond), 18 paces by 12 wide, is probably not the work of the Arabs. It is partly dug in the rock and partly constructed of large polygonal blocks coated with thick cement."

An Ottoman village list from about the same year, 1870,   showed Kula with a population of 159, in 38 houses,  though the population count included men, only.

In 1882, the PEF's Survey of Western Palestine (SWP)  the village of Qula was described as being situated on a slope at the edge of a plain; its historical relics dating back to medieval times. The SWP also noted ancient remains.

The village mosque stood approximately 10m east of the Crusader tower. It comprised a large vaulted iwan and a smaller room with an inscription above the entrance.

British Mandate
During the British mandate period, the village expanded along the Ramle-Tulkarm highway. In the village center was the mosque, several small shops, and a school which had been founded in 1919. By the mid-1940s the school had 134 students.

In the  1922 census of Palestine, Quleh  had a population of 480  Muslims,  increasing in the 1931 census to 697, still all Muslims, in a total of 172 houses.

In  the 1945 statistics  the population was 1,010, all Muslims,  while the total land area was 4,347  dunams, according to an official land and population survey. Of this, a total  of 2,842 dunums of land was used for cereals, 105 dunums were irrigated or used for orchards, while 26 dunams were classified as built-up areas.

1948 Arab-Israeli War and aftermath

Fighting in the region took place between the IDF and Arab Legion's forces during Operation Dani during the "Ten Days" after the end of the First Truce in the 1948 War. The IDF's Alexandroni Brigade had been sent to secure the area south of the Iraqi Army's zone of control, and fought over the village with the Arab League's First Brigade. The IDF captured the village for the last time on July 18, just before the start of the Second Truce. An IDF report stated that after capture of the village, the mutilated bodies of 19 members of the Alexandroni Brigade were discovered. Most of the villagers fled during the war, leaving only a few, primarily elderly behind. In the late 1990s, researcher Abdel Jawad reported testimony from former villagers who stated that six women and one man who were left behind were shot or burned to death in their homes.

The ruins of the town can be found in the Kula Forest in Israel. In 1992, The Palestinian historian Walid Khalidi described the site: "A forest covers much of the village site. The rubble of crumbled houses and terraces lies among the trees, and cactuses and fig, mulberry, and eucalyptus trees grow there as well. The only remaining landmark is the school, on the west side of the site. The hilly parts of the surrounding land are used for grazing animals; the rest of the land is cultivated.

See also
Depopulated Palestinian locations in Israel
List of villages depopulated during the Arab-Israeli conflict

References

Bibliography

 
 
 
  

 

 

  

Pringle, R. D. (1986), The Red Tower (al-Burj al-Ahmar): Settlement in the Plain of Sharon at the Time of the Crusaders and Mamluks, A.D. 1099-1516, British School of Archeology in Jerusalem Monograph Series, No. 1, London. (Cited in Petersen, 2001)
  (Cited in Petersen, 2001) (p.87, cites SWP, 1882, II, p.297 and p.358)

  (p. 162, no. 611)

External links
Welcome to Qula
Qula, Zochrot
Survey of Western Palestine, Map 14:  IAA, Wikimedia commons 
Qula, at Khalil Sakakini Cultural Center
Qala (webarchive), Qala Dr. Moslih Kanaaneh
Being in Place, of Place, in Qula…. by Rula Awwad-Rafferty, August 2008, Zochrot
Visit in Qula village, Report by Eitan Bronstein, 2008, Zochrot

Arab villages depopulated during the 1948 Arab–Israeli War
District of Ramla
Castles and fortifications of the Knights Hospitaller